Londža is a river in Slavonia, eastern Croatia, a left tributary of Orljava.

Londža rises in the southwestern slopes of the Krndija mountain, runs through Požega Valley, and flows into Orljava river near the town of Pleternica.

Sources
 Londža at the Proleksis Encyclopedia 

Rivers of Croatia
Slavonia
Landforms of Požega-Slavonia County